The following is a list of tropical cyclones by year. Since the year 957, there have been at least 12,791 recorded tropical or subtropical cyclones in the Atlantic, Pacific, and Indian Oceans, which are known as basins. Collectively, tropical cyclones caused more than US$1.2 trillion in damage, unadjusted for inflation, and have killed more than 2.6 million people. Most of these deaths were caused by a few deadly cyclones, including the 1737 Calcutta cyclone, the 1839 Coringa cyclone, the 1931 Shanghai typhoon, the 1970 Bhola cyclone, Typhoon Nina in 1975, the 1991 Bangladesh cyclone, and Cyclone Nargis in 2008.

In the North Atlantic Ocean, there have been 2,462 tropical cyclones, including at least 1,150 hurricanes, which have maximum sustained winds of at least 64 knots (74 mph, 119 km/h). The storms collectively killed more than 180,000 people. In the eastern Pacific Ocean, there have been 1,313 tropical cyclones, including 552 hurricanes; the storms collectively killed 8,467 people. In the western Pacific Ocean, there have been 4,648 tropical cyclones, including at least 1,485 typhoons; the storms collectively killed more than 1.4 million people. In the North Indian Ocean, there have been at least 1,551 tropical cyclones, including 262 that attained the equivalent of hurricane status; the storms collectively killed over 1 million people. There have been at least 2,768 tropical cyclones in the Southern Hemisphere.

Storms with an asterisk (*) originated in another basin.

Table of cyclones

See also
 Weather by year
 Atlantic hurricane season
 Pacific hurricane season
 Pacific typhoon season
 North Indian Ocean cyclone season
 South-West Indian Ocean cyclone season
 Australian region cyclone season
 South Pacific cyclone season
 South Atlantic tropical cyclone

Notes

References